China Jones is a 1959 Warner Bros. Looney Tunes short directed by Robert McKimson. The short was released on February 14, 1959, and stars Daffy Duck. This cartoon later became rarely shown in the United States due to ethnic caricatures of Chinese and other East Asian people. The cartoon is a spoof of the 1950s TV series China Smith, starring Dan Duryea.

Plot

Daffy Duck is China Jones, an Irish private investigator working in the Far East. He finds a fortune cookie containing a call for help which states: "Help. I am being held prisoner in a Chinese Bakery", and decides to investigate. This is actually a trap set by a vengeful criminal named Limey Louie, whom Jones had busted before. Several times throughout, Jones' assistant. Charlie Chung (Porky), a caricature for Charlie Chan, reminds China Jones that he owes him a great deal of money, revealed at the end, after Jones escapes from Limey Louie, to be due to a large laundry bill. When Jones tells Chung "Confucius say, 'can squeeze blood from turnip!'", the latter threatens him with a club, telling him "Also say, 'B-better you press shirt than press luck!'" The last scene shows Jones being forced to work for Chung, as he speaks in "Chinese": "Help! - I'm being held prisoner in a Chinese Laundry!" (in reference to the earlier fortune).

Censorship

In the 1990s, cable network Nickelodeon removed the ending, which is the laundromat scene when Daffy was held prisoner with his faux Chinese rant. The reason is due to offensive ethnic stereotypes, as that cartoon wasn't shown in the United States nor the United Kingdom, not even DVD or Blu-ray Disc until WarnerMedia Ride restored a streaming print in 2021.

References

External links

1959 animated films
1959 short films
1959 films
1950s Warner Bros. animated short films
Films directed by Robert McKimson
Daffy Duck films
Porky Pig films
Looney Tunes shorts
Films scored by Milt Franklyn
1950s English-language films
American detective films